Rhea Sharma (born 7 August 1995) is an Indian actress who primarily works in Hindi television. She made her acting debut in 2014 with the television series Itna Karo Na Mujhe Pyaar portraying Nishi Khanna. In 2016, she made her film debut with the Hindi film M.S. Dhoni: The Untold Story portraying Ritu. Sharma is a recipient of Gold Awards, along with other nominations.

Sharma earned wider recognition with her portrayal of Dr. Kanak Rathi Toshniwal in Tu Sooraj Main Saanjh, Piyaji and Mishti Agrawal Rajvansh in Yeh Rishtey Hain Pyaar Ke.

Early life 
Sharma was born on 7 August 1995 into a Hindu family in Mumbai, Maharashtra. She completed her graduation from St. Xavier's College, Mumbai. Sharma aspired to be a journalist, but later choose acting as her career.

Career

Debut and early roles (2014-2016) 

Sharma made her acting debut with Itna Karo Na Mujhe Pyaar portraying  Nishi Khanna Shah, from 2014 to 2015 opposite Mehul Vyas. In 2014, she portrayed Priyanka "Priya" Prabhakar Datar in Badi Doooor Se Aaye Hai. She portrayed Chandini Kapoor opposite Darsheel Safary in Yeh Hai Aashiqui Sun Yaar Try Maar in 2015.
 
In 2016, she portrayed Shubhi Deshpande
in Yeh Hai Aashiqui opposite Kinshuk Vaidya. Sharma then, portrayed Gauri Shukla in Kahani Hamari... Dil Dosti Deewanepan Ki opposite Karan Wahi in the same year. The show ended in a month.

In 2016, Sharma also made her Hindi film debut with Neeraj Pandey's M.S. Dhoni: The Untold Story, which co-starred Sushant Singh Rajput and Kiara Advani and featured her as Ritu, the friend of Dhoni's wife.

Breakthrough and success (2017-present) 

Sharma portrayed Dr. Kanak Rathi Toshniwal in Tu Sooraj Main Saanjh, Piyaji from 2017 to 2018, opposite Avinesh Rekhi. It proved as a major turning point in her career. Sharma's performance received Gold Award for Debut in a Lead Role (Female) nomination.

In 2018, she portrayed Komal Mishra in Laal Ishq opposite Ruslaan Mumtaz. The same year she portrayed Anjali Sharma in Kumkum Bhagya opposite Vishal Singh recreating Kuch Kuch Hota Hai.
 
Sharma received further success and praises with her portrayal of Mishti Agarwal Rajvansh opposite Shaheer Sheikh in Yeh Rishtey Hain Pyaar Ke from 2019 to 2020. She received Gold Award for Best Actress in a Lead Role nomination for her performance. Her chemistry with Sheikh was appreciated and they won Gold Best Onscreen Jodi Award, at the same ceremony.

She also portrayed Mishti in the integration episodes with Yeh Rishta Kya Kehlata Hai and had a dance performance in Nach Baliye 9 with Sheikh.

After a hiatus of two years, Sharma appeared opposite Sumedh Mudgalkar in the 2022 music video, "Tu Hi Toh Hai".

Public image 
Sharma ranked 30th in Eastern Eyes "Top 50 Asian Celebrities" List of 2020. She was also placed in Eastern Eyes "Top 30 under 30" Global Asian Stars List of 2021.

Filmography

Films

Television

Special appearances

Music videos

Accolades

See also 
List of Indian television actresses
List of Hindi television actresses

References

External links 
 
 

Living people
Actresses from Mumbai
Indian television actresses
Indian soap opera actresses
Actresses in Hindi television
Indian film actresses
Actresses in Hindi cinema
21st-century Indian actresses
St. Xavier's College, Mumbai alumni
1995 births